Exterior cleaning is the process of cleaning a building's exterior part including the restoration of hygiene or removal of litter and/or dirt on the outside of the building. It is not to be confused with interior cleaning, the act of cleaning inside a building. Exterior cleaning draws on aspects of environmental care, architecture preservation, and public safety, in addition to traditional cleaning. In some jurisdictions, exterior cleaners must be licensed to practice, e.g., window cleaners require a license to operate in Scotland.

Specializations
Exterior cleaning companies can focus on residential or commercial cleaning, and exterior cleaners may specialize in a particular field, e.g., the cleaning of bronze monuments or graffiti removal.

Exterior cleaners can specialize in:

 Bronze cleaning and restoration
 Cladding
 Conservatory roof cleaning
 Deck cleaning, staining and waxing
 Fascia (architecture)
 Glazing
 Gutters
 Graffiti removal and protection
 Patio furniture
 Paving
 Siding
 Sign cleaning
 Solar panel cleaning
 Stone cleaning and restoration
 Swimming pools

See also
 Environmental psychology
 Roof cleaning
 Window cleaner
 Green cleaning

References

External links

Cleaning